The Ministry of Road Transport and Highways (MoRTH) is a ministry of the Government of India, that is the apex body for formulation and administration of the rules, regulations and laws relating to road transport, transport research and in also to increase the mobility and efficiency of the road transport system in India. Through its officers of Central Engineering Services (Roads) cadre it is responsible for the development of National Highways of the country.  Road transport is a critical infrastructure for economic development of the country. It influences the pace, structure and pattern of development. In India, roads are used to transport over 60 percent of the total goods and 85 percent of the passenger traffic. Hence, development of this sector is of paramount importance for India and accounts for a significant part in the budget.

History

Creation 
The Department of War Transport was formed in July, 1942, by the bifurcation of the then Department of Communications into two Departments:

 Department of Posts
 Department of War Transport.
 Department of war READ MORE
The functions allocated to the Department of war Transport include Major Ports, Railways Priorities, utilization of road and water transport, Petrol rationing and Producer Gas. Broadly speaking, the functions of the War Transport Department were to coordinate the demands for transport in war time, Coastal Shipping and the administration and development of major ports. Later, the planning of export was undertaken as a corollary to the Departments control of transport priorities also.

Changes made over years 
 1957: Department of War Transport was renamed as Ministry of Transport & Communications and Department of transport was placed under it.
 1966: On 25 January, under President's order the Department of Transport, Shipping & Tourism was placed under Ministry of Transport and Aviation.
 1967: On 13 March, the Ministry of Transport and Aviation was bifurcated into Ministry of Shipping and Transport and the Ministry of Tourism and Civil Aviation.
 1985: On 25 September, during reorganisation the Ministry of Transport and Shipping became the Department of Surface Transport under the Ministry of Transport.
 1986: On 22 October, the Department of Surface Transport under Ministry of Transport was renamed as Ministry of Surface Transport .
 1999: On 15 October, Ministry of Surface Transport was subsequently re-organized into departments, namely Department of Shipping and Department of Road Transport and Highways.
 2000: On 17 November, the Ministry of Surface Transport was bifurcated into two Ministries namely Ministry of Road Transport and Highways and Ministry of Shipping.
 2004: On 2 October, Ministry of Shipping and Ministry of Road Transport has again been merged and renamed as Ministry of Shipping and Road Transport and Highways
There are two departments under it:
 Department of Shipping
 Department of Road transport and Highways

Organisational structure 
 The Ministry of Road Transport Highways is structurally divided into Road wing, Transport Wing and its independent Finance Wing. Apart from these there is the Planning and Monitoring zone.
The Secretary (Road Transport & Highways) is assisted by Director General (Road Development) & Special Secretary, Joint Secretary (Road Transport),  Financial Advisor, Advisor (Transport Research).
Director General (Road Development) is responsible for Development & Maintenance of National Highways.
 Joint Secretary looks after transport administration, public grievances, vigilance road safety and coordination & public relations
 Accounts Wing is headed by the Chief Controller of Accounts who is responsible for accounts budget, work and study.
 Advisor (Transport Research) renders necessary data support to various wings of the Ministry for policy planning, transport coordination, economic and statistical analysis on various modes of transport with which the ministry is concerned.

Following are the autonomous agencies, subordinate offices regional offices under the Director General.

Agencies 
 National Highway Authority of India (NHAI), Delhi
 National Highways and Infrastructure Development Corporation Limited (NHIDCL), New Delhi
 Indian Roads Construction Corporation (IRCC)
 Indian Academy of Highway Engineers (IAHE), Sector 62, Noida

Regional Offices 
 Bangalore
 Chennai
 Mumbai
 Kolkata
 Chandigarh
 Jaipur
 Patna
 Guwahati
 Hyderabad
 Gandhinagar
 Bhubaneshwar
 Bhopal
 Thiruvananthapuram
 Lucknow
 Varanasi
 Raipur
 Dehradun
 Shimla
 Surat
The ministry has following wings functioning under it:

Roads Wing 
The road wing of the MORTH is the backbone of the country's road network development programme. It is staffed by officers of the Central Engineering Services (Roads). It is headed by Director General (Road Development) and Special Secretary to the Government of India.

The Road wing of MORTH is further divided into five Project Zones. Each Project zone is generally vested with responsibility of four to five states for National highway development and development of road network. These five project Zones are headed by five Additional  Director Generals (ADG) of Central Engineering Services (Roads) cadre who are assisted by Zonal Chief Engineer of Headquarter and Regional Officers. Regional officers are posted on ground in their respective states for development and maintenance of National Highways through State PWDs.

Main responsibilities of the roads wing are:

 Planning, development and maintenance of National Highways
 Extends technical and financial support to the state government for development of state roads and roads of inter-state connectivity and national importance.
 Setting standards for building and maintenance of roads and bridges.
 Archiving important technical knowledge generated through projects and R&D.
Sanctioning of works related to construction, maintenance and operation of National Highways.
Sanctioning the estimates for various centrally sponsored schemes including CRF (Central Road Fund), Roads of Interstate Connectivity.
Dealing the matters related to road safety.
 Administration of NH act 1956, The Highway Administration Rules 2005

Transport Wing 
Main responsibilities of the transport wing are:
 Motor Vehicle Legislation
 Taxation of motor vehicles
 Compulsory insurance for vehicles
 Promotion of Transport cooperatives in the field of motor transport.
 Setting National road safety standards
 Compiling data on road accidents and evolving a road safety culture among the people in the country
 Providing grants to NGOs in accordance with laid down guidelines.

Planning and Monitoring Zone 
This zones are headed by two separate Chief Engineers of Central Engineering Services (Roads). Main responsibilities of this zone are:

 Preparation of budgets and scheme wise allocation of funds maintaining records of expenditure.
 Identification of stretches that may form probable network of National Highways.
 Notification and de-notification of National Highways.
 The Monitoring Zone deals with the monitoring and reviewing progress of ongoing NH works dealt by various executing Agencies of NH development.

Standards and Research (S&R) Zone 
This zones is headed by a Chief Engineers of Central Engineering Services (Roads). Main responsibilities of this zone is  Preparation of standards/ rules / guidelines for NH development program and related activities.

Acts 
Over years the ministry has passed several acts to maintain law and order in Road Transport in the country
 Road Transport Corporations Act, 1950
 National Highways Act, 1956
 Motor Vehicles Act, 1988
 National Highways Authority of India Act, 1988

Statistics 
India has one of the largest road networks of over 4.885 million km consisting of :

The total road length of India had grown more than 11 times in 60 years from 1951 to 2011; also the length of the surfaced roads had increased about 16 times over the same period. The connectivity in India has tremendously improved due to formation of new surface roads.

For development of roads in the country the government has made an allocation of ₹19,423.88 crores under the Central Road Fund for 2013–2014 with the following breakup:

Government Initiatives 
The government has provided various incentives for private and foreign investments in the roads sector. 100% FDI is allowed in the sectors of land transport to promote building of highway bridges, toll roads, and vehicular tunnels; services incidental to transport such as cargo handling is incidental to land transport; construction and maintenance of roads, bridges; and construction and maintenance of roads and highways offered on build-operate-transfer (BOT) basis, including collection of toll.

A 10-year tax exemption under Section 80 IA has been granted to the highway building projects to attract private investors. The ministry has also framed a ‘Special Accelerated Road Development Programme in North Eastern Region' for improving road connectivity to remote places in this region. The estimated cost of the proposal is US$2.53 billion.

The World Bank has approved a US$975 million loan for developing the first phase of the eastern arm of the US$17.21 billion Dedicated Freight Corridor Project in India. The Dedicated Freight Corridor Corporation of India Ltd. has tied up with the Japanese Bank of Industrial Cooperation for US$14.56 billion funding as loan for the first phase and it is likely to be commissioned in 2016.

The Prime Minister Gram Sadak Yojana (PMGSY) is a scheme for development of rural roads in India. The Construction of Rural Roads Project (CRRP) is another initiative focused on rural development.

National Green Highways Program 
Ministry of Transport and NHAI has launched the green highways programme in 2016.

List of Ministers of Road Transport and Highways

List of Ministers of State

See also 
 National Highways Authority of India
 National Highways and Infrastructure Development Corporation Limited
 Ministry of Surface Transport (India)
 FASTag

References 

15. https://sarathi.parivahan.gov.in/SarathiReport/sarathiHomePublic.do

External links 
Ministry website
Parivahan Sewa
Sarathi Parivahan Sewa

 
Road Transport and Highways
Road transport in India